MŠK Žilina are a Slovak football club which are based in Žilina. During the 2013/14 campaign they will be competing in the Slovak Super League, Slovak Cup, UEFA Europa League.

Competitions

Slovak Super Liga

League table

Matches

References

MŠK Žilina seasons
MSK Zilina season